Isla San Luis is an island in the Gulf of California east of the Baja California Peninsula. The island is uninhabited and is part of the San Felipe Municipality.

Biology
Isla San Luis has three species of reptiles: Callisaurus draconoides (zebra-tailed lizard), Dipsosaurus dorsalis (desert iguana), and Uta stansburiana (common side-blotched lizard).

References

Islands of Baja California
Islands of the Gulf of California
Uninhabited islands of Mexico